The 1930 Boston College Eagles football team represented Boston College as an independent during the 1930 college football season. The Eagles were led by third-year head coach Joe McKenney and played their home games at Fenway Park in Boston. The team captain was John Dixon. Boston College finished the season with a record of 5–5.

Schedule

References

Boston College
Boston College Eagles football seasons
Boston College Eagles football
1930s in Boston